Michael Masih (born 7 June 1985) is a Pakistani footballer, who plays for Pakistan Army FC. He is also a member of Pakistan national football team.

Masih is a midfielder who earned his first international cap against Nepal in a friendly in 2008. His scored his first goal against Chinese Taipei in the 2008 AFC Challenge Cup.

International Career Stats

Goals for Senior National Team

Honours
With Pakistan Army FC
Pakistan Premier League 2005, 2006/07

References

1985 births
Living people
Pakistani footballers
Pakistan international footballers
Pakistani Christians
People from Bhimber District
Association football midfielders